Jacob "Jake" Quickenden (born 3 September 1988) is an English singer, footballer and reality television personality. He was a contestant on the ninth and eleventh series of The X Factor in 2012 and 2014, before being runner-up in series 14 of I'm a Celebrity...Get Me Out of Here! in December 2014.

Football career

Quickenden plays football, mainly as a winger or forward. He began his football career as a youth player for Scunthorpe United but suffered a broken leg, ending his chances with his hometown club. Following recovery he was offered trials in Australia with Bentleigh Greens and Sunshine George Cross, eventually playing professionally in Australia for two years. He then returned to England and went on to play for Frickley Athletic in the Evo-Stik Northern Premier League, Premier Division. Most recently he played for Lincolnshire club Bottesford Town in the Northern Counties East Football League. In 2015, he was rumoured to have been offered the opportunity to play for Gainsborough Trinity, but denied it. He joined Ossett Town in 2017.

Media career
Quickenden began his media career by appearing on the talent show The X Factor. After his 2012 departure, he has made a number of other media appearances since, including working as a presenter on the Chart Show TV channel.

His current work includes advertising products on social media as an influencer. Between May and July 2022 the Advertising Standards Agency reprimanded Quickenden for failing to disclose commercial relationships with advertisers on his channels, including his Instagram account.

The X Factor

In 2012, Quickenden auditioned for the ninth series of The X Factor, where he sang "Use Somebody" and received four yesses from the judges. At bootcamp, along with fellow contestants Adam Burridge and Robbie Hance, he sang "How to Save a Life". The judges decided to put him through to judges' houses where he was in the Boys category along with Burridge, Nathan Fagan-Gayle, Rylan Clark, Jahméne Douglas, and the series' eventual winner James Arthur and their mentor was Nicole Scherzinger. Quickenden sang "Back for Good" in front of Scherzinger and her guest, Ne-Yo. The next day, Scherzinger decided not to put Quickenden through to the live shows, choosing Clark, Douglas, and Arthur instead.

In 2014, Quickenden once again auditioned for the eleventh series of The X Factor, where he sang "All of Me", but was stopped and asked to perform his second song, "Say Something". Quickenden received positive comments from the judges for his second song and gave him four yeses to proceed to the next round. In the arena audition, he performed "Who You Are" by Jessie J. Quickenden received good comments from the judges. Head judge Simon Cowell commented that he was not a big fan of previous contestants returning since there was usually a reason for them being sent home, but said that he was not judging in the 2012 series and that Quickenden should not have been eliminated. The judges decided to put Quickenden through to bootcamp. He was again in the "Boys" category with Mel B as his mentor. In the six-chair challenge of bootcamp, Quickenden sang "A Thousand Years" and his mentor gave him a chair and proceeded to the next round. At judges' houses, he sang "Every Little Thing She Does Is Magic" and was put through to the live shows along with Andrea Faustini and Paul Akister.

On 27 October, Quickenden landed in the bottom two in week 3 against Only the Young and was eliminated, with only his mentor Mel B voting to save him.

I'm a Celebrity...Get Me Out of Here!

Beginning on 20 November 2014, Quickenden took part in 14th series of I'm a Celebrity...Get Me Out of Here!, entering the jungle on Day 5 of the competition with former politician Edwina Currie. Jake finished the show as runner-up to World Superbike racer Carl 'Foggy' Fogarty.

Dancing on Ice

Quickenden was a contestant in the 10th series of Dancing on Ice, where he was partnered with professional German figure skater Vanessa Bauer. On 11 March 2018, he and Bauer won the competition over Brooke Vincent and Max Evans.

Filmography

Theatre

Discography

Extended plays

Singles

See also
 List of Dancing on Ice contestants
 List of I'm a Celebrity...Get Me Out of Here! (British TV series) contestants
 List of The X Factor (British TV series) finalists

References

External links

1988 births
Living people
English footballers
English male models
English people of Italian descent
English pop singers
English television personalities
English television presenters
Sportspeople from Scunthorpe
People of Venetian descent
Caroline Springs George Cross FC players
Frickley Athletic F.C. players
Bottesford Town F.C. players
Ossett Town F.C. players
The X Factor (British TV series) contestants
Reality show winners
Association football forwards
I'm a Celebrity...Get Me Out of Here! (British TV series) participants